Arild Lund (born 4 March 1940) is a Norwegian politician for the Conservative Party.

He was elected to the Norwegian Parliament from Vestfold in 1993, but was not re-elected in 1997.

Born  in Tjølling, Lund was a member of Tjølling municipal council from 1967 to 1987, except for the term 1975–1979, serving as deputy mayor in 1971–1975 and mayor in 1979–1983. He then became mayor of its successor municipality Larvik from 1987 to 1991. He was also a deputy member of Vestfold county council from 1971–1979 and 1991–1995.

References

1940 births
Living people
Mayors of places in Vestfold
Members of the Storting
Conservative Party (Norway) politicians
People from Larvik
20th-century Norwegian politicians